Mathias François Dewatripont (born 27 December 1959) is a Belgian economist and professor at the Université libre de Bruxelles (ULB) and visiting professor at the Massachusetts Institute of Technology (MIT).

He studied economics at the ULB, and obtained a PhD at Harvard University (United States) in 1986 (under the supervision of Eric Maskin and Andreu Mas-Colell). He is a member of the Economic Advisory Group for Competition Policy of the DG Competition (European Commission), since 2004. He is a member of European Commission President José Manuel Durão Barroso's Group of Economic Policy Analysis, since 2005.
In 2005, he was President of the European Economic Association. He is a member of the Econometric Society and Research Director at CEPR.

He is one of the 22 members of the Scientific Council of the European Research Council.

He is member of the Académie Royale de Belgique and has been elected Foreign Honorary Member of the American Academy of Arts and Sciences (April 2009).

In 1998, he was awarded the Francqui Prize on Human Sciences, and in 2003 he received the Yrjö Jahnsson Award.

He was Chairman of the Oxera Economic Council.  He is member of the Scientific Council of the Toulouse School of Economics, member of the Scientific Council of the Barcelona Graduate School of Economics, member of the Scientific Council of CentER (Tilburg University), and Chairman of the Scientific Council of the ULB Foundation.

He is Deputy Chairman (2008–09), Chairman (2009–10) and Dean (2010–11) of the Solvay Brussels School of Economics and Management (SBS-EM) of the Université libre de Bruxelles (ULB).

He has been member of the Haut Conseil de la Science et de la Technologie, Ministère français de l'Enseignement supérieur et de la Recherche, since 2009.

He has been appointed Executive Director of the National Bank of Belgium since April 2011.

Selected works 
 On the Theory of Commitment, with Applications to the labor Market (Contract Theory, Labor Unions). PhD dissertation, Harvard University, United States—Massachusetts, 1986.
Published as: 
 La Réglementation Prudentielle des Banques, (with J. Tirole), Payot, Lausanne, 1993.
 The Prudential Regulation of Banks, (with J. Tirole, expanded English version of La Réglementation Prudentielle des Banques), MIT Press, Cambridge, 1994 (also translated in Japanese (1996), Italian (1998) and Chinese (2002)).
 Contract Theory, (with P. Bolton), MIT Press, Cambridge, 2005 (also translated in Chinese (2008)).
 Macroeconomic Stability and Financial Regulation: Key Issues for the G20, co-auteurs: X. Freixas & R. Portes, VoxEU & CEPR ebook, 2009
 Bailing out the Banks: Reconciling Stability and Competition: An analysis of state-supported schemes for financial institutions, co-auteurs: T. Beck, D. Coyle, X. Freixas & P. Seabright, CEPR, London, 2010.
 Balancing the Banks: Global Lessons from the Financial Crisis, co-auteurs: J.-C. Rochet & J. Tirole, Princeton University Press, 2010.

External links 
 Mathias Dewatripont at ECARE
 

1959 births
Living people
Université libre de Bruxelles alumni
Harvard University alumni
20th-century Belgian economists
21st-century Belgian economists
Fellows of the Econometric Society
Fellows of the American Academy of Arts and Sciences